L'Ora (English: The Hour) was a Sicilian daily newspaper published in Palermo. The paper was founded in 1900 and stopped being published in 1992. In the 1950s-1980s the paper was known for its investigative reporting about the Sicilian Mafia.

Foundation
The paper was founded on the initiative of the entrepreneurial Florio family from Palermo with interests in shipping, shipbuilding, trade and wine industry, fisheries, mining, metallurgy and ceramics. The first issue was published on April 22, 1900. The formal owner was Carlo Di Rudinì, the son of the former prime minister of Italy Antonio Di Rudinì, but the main shareholder and financier was Ignazio Florio Jr. The first editor of the paper until 1902 was Vincenzo Morello, one of the most respected Italian political journalists of the time. Before directing L'Ora, Morello had worked for La Tribuna, at that time the most widespread newspaper in the center-south of Italy. Other collaborators were Napoleone Colajanni, Francesco Saverio Nitti and Luigi Capuana.

The political direction of the newspaper was generally republican and progressive, representing the Sicilian entrepreneurial middle class. After the First World War the editorial line turned against the rise of fascism. During this period one of the significant contributors was Alberto Cianca. In November 1926, in the aftermath of the failed attack against Benito Mussolini in Bologna, the paper was suppressed, along with other anti-Fascist newspapers.

L'Ora reappeared in January 1927 under the direction of Nicola Pascazio, a man close to the Fascist regime, former editor of the Il Popolo d'Italia ("People of Italy"), the organ of the National Fascist Party, with the subtitle "fascist newspaper of the Mediterranean". The Allied invasion of Sicily in July 1943 resulted in the suspension of the newspaper, but publishing resumed on April 8, 1946.

The paper changed ownership several times. In 1954, the widow of the last owner sold the newspaper to the GATE company, which was owned by the Italian Communist Party (Partito Comunista Italiano – PCI) and directed by Amerigo Terenzi, already in charge of the newspaper Paese Sera.

Golden years

Under the new ownership, the newspaper enjoyed its golden years under the editor-in-chief Vittorio Nistico, who directed the paper between 1954-1975. In this period the journal developed into a newspaper that published many investigative reports about the Sicilian Mafia, in an era that the organisation was hardly mentioned.

In 1958, L'Ora published a series of investigative reports about the rise of Mafia boss Luciano Leggio in Corleone after the killing of the previous boss Michele Navarra in August 1958, by reporters Felice Chilanti, Mario Farinella, Enzo Lucchi, Michele Pantaleone, Castrense Dadò and Enzo Perrone. The retaliation of Leggio was swift: at 4:52 a.m. on October 19, 1958, a bomb of five kilos TNT exploded in front the newspaper office blowing up half the printing press. Two days later the paper appeared again; the front-page headline read: "The mafia threatens us, the investigation continues" (see Infobox).

The price of the journal's civic engagement was the killing of three of its journalists. The first was Cosimo Cristina, who was killed on May 5, 1960, investigating the Mafia in the area of Termini Imerese. Next was Mauro De Mauro who disappeared on September 16, 1970, investigating the involvement of the Mafia with the death of Eni president Enrico Mattei. And finally, Giovanni Spampinato, who was killed on October 27, 1972, while looking into the activities of neo-fascism in Sicily and Mafia smuggling activities along the east coast of Sicily.

Decline
In the 1970s, the newspaper started to have financial problems. As an afternoon paper, it was more vulnerable to the competition of TV news than its main competitor, the Giornale di Sicilia. The paper also lost support of the PCI that decided to concentrate on its main publication L'Unità in combination with the historic compromise, trying to accommodate the Christian Democrats (DC).

Although L'Ora changed to publish as a morning newspaper in 1976, the costs that this entailed proved to be excessive and in 1979 the PCI decided the closure of the newspaper. L'Ora, however, "refused to die": a cooperative of journalists and administrators got the right to use the title and the property, while a cooperative of workers got the use of the equipment under the same conditions. The measures were taken in the hope of acquiring financial and editorial independence. Nevertheless, by 1980 the Giornale di Sicilia managed to take advantage of the papers weakened position and demoralized staff to lure away four of its younger and promising reporters (Roberto Ciuno, Francesco La Licata, Daniele Billiteri and Franco Nicastro) to form a new crime staff, which competed with L'Ora on one of its main news subjects.

From the economic point of view the journal was kept alive thanks to the NEM (Nuova Editrice Meridionale), a company formed by the cooperatives in agreement with the Communist Party, which owned the title and the equipment. Despite the fact that the technological upgrading and renovation of the headquarters in Palermo was successful, editorial and managerial problems led to a lack of adequate leadership. Although the paper enjoyed a revival of sales in 1992, this did not prevent the PDS (Partito Democratico della Sinistra - Democratic Party of the Left), the successor of the PCI, to liquidate L'Ora. The last issue was published on May 8, 1992.

On 29 September 2019, the street where the editorial staff of the newspaper used to be located was renamed Via "Giornale L'Ora"  on the occasion of the tenth anniversary of the death of Vittorio Nisticò, the historical director of the newspaper. A commemorative plaque was inaugurated to honour the three reporters killed by the Mafia: Mauro De Mauro, Cosimo Cristina and Giovanni Spampinato and the Mafia attack that hit the printing house in 1958.

References 

 Schneider, Jane T. & Peter T. Schneider (2003). Reversible Destiny: Mafia, Antimafia, and the Struggle for Palermo, Berkeley: University of California Press

External links 
Culture of Lawlessness: The Role of the Mass Media has a chapter by reporter Attilio Bolzoni about working at L'Ora at the end of the 1970s

1900 establishments in Italy
1992 disestablishments in Italy
Defunct newspapers published in Italy
History of the Sicilian Mafia
Italian-language newspapers
Mass media in Palermo
Daily newspapers published in Italy
Newspapers established in 1900
Publications disestablished in 1992
Florio family